The Mothering Heart is a 1913 American short drama film directed by  D. W. Griffith. A print of the film survives in the film archive of the Museum of Modern Art.

Plot
The film opens by showing a young woman (Lillian Gish) in a garden. She is tender hearted, demonstrated by her appreciation of  the flowers and the rescuing of a puppy. A melancholic young man (Walter Miller) woos her and she is foolishly swayed more by his pain of rejection than her love for him and eventually agrees to marry.

Later in their new home together she takes in washing to help support them when her new husband has little income. Things change when he finds some success in a well paid job. He insists they celebrate at a restaurant where there is an Apache dance cabaret. He wears a new suit but she her plain street clothes. Her husband's eye is caught by a sophisticated single woman (Viola Barry) at the next table. Later, encouraged by the woman, the husband begins to deceive his wife and have clandestine meetings with her. She is rich and has a chauffeur-driven car at her disposal.

The wife, now pregnant, as evidenced by her interest in baby clothes, discovers a glove in her husband's coat pocket. She follows him and uncovers his deceit. After confronting her husband she leaves him and returns to the home of her mother (played by Kate Bruce) where the baby is born.

We now see the husband being dropped by the sophisticated woman for a new richer male companion (Charles West). The dejected husband sitting alone at home receives a letter from the wife telling him of the birth. He resolves to make it up with her.

We learn next that the baby has become ill and is attended by a doctor (Adolph Lestina).  The husband arrives at the wife's mother's house and she allows him to see the wife and child. However the wife wants none of him and angrily rejects him. While the husband sits dejected in the garden the baby dies. The wife vents her anger on the bushes in the part of the  garden in which the film opened.

She returns to find her husband bent in grief over the crib. He is tenderly holding the baby's dummy. Their hands touch and the husband sees she is still wearing her wedding ring. They are reunited in an embrace and the film ends.

Cast
 Walter Miller as Joe - the Young Husband
 Lillian Gish as The Young Wife
 Kate Bruce as Young Wife's Mother
 Viola Barry as The 'Idle Woman' / Outside Club (as Peggy Pearce)
 Charles West as The 'New Light' / Among Waiters
 Adolph Lestina as The Doctor / Club Patron
 Jennie Lee as The Wash Customer
 Charles Murray as Male Apache Dancer
 Gertrude Bambrick as Female Apache Dancer
 William J. Butler as Club Patron
 Christy Cabanne as Outside Club
 Donald Crisp as Undetermined Role (unconfirmed)
 Josephine Crowell as Woman Collecting Ironing
 Edward Dillon as Club Patron
 John T. Dillon as Club Patron
 William Elmer as Doorman
 Dell Henderson as Club Patron
 Harry Hyde as Outside Club
 J. Jiquel Lanoe as Outside Club / Club Patron
 Charles Hill Mailes as Club Patron
 Mae Marsh as Undetermined Role (unconfirmed)
 Joseph McDermott as Among Waiters
 Alfred Paget as Club Patron
 Gus Pixley as Club Patron
 W. C. Robinson as Club Patron
 Henry B. Walthall as Club Patron

See also
 D. W. Griffith filmography
 Lillian Gish filmography

References

External links

 The Mothering Heart on YouTube

1913 films
1913 drama films
1913 short films
Silent American drama films
American silent short films
American black-and-white films
Articles containing video clips
Films directed by D. W. Griffith
1910s American films